John Engaine (died 1322), Lord of Laxton, was an English noble.

Life
John was a son of John Engaine and Joan Greinville. He accompanied Edward I of England to France in 1286, was at the Battle of Falkirk in 1298 and the Siege of Caerlaverock in 1300. He married Ellen de Clavering daughter of  Robert fitzRoger and Margaret de la Zouch. John died in 1322 without issue.

References
Cokayne, G. E. The complete peerage of England, Scotland, Ireland, Great Britain and the United Kingdom, extant, extinct, or dormant. Volume 5. 1926. pages 71-81.

Year of birth unknown
1322 deaths
13th-century English people
14th-century English people